The Heel Stone is a single large block of sarsen stone standing within the Avenue outside the entrance of the Stonehenge earthwork in Wiltshire, England. Excavation has shown that a further  is buried in the ground.
It leans towards the southwest nearly 27 degrees from the vertical. It is surrounded by the Heelstone Ditch.

Myths and legends of the Devil striking a "Friar's Heel" with a stone resulted in its eccentric name, Heel Stone. Some claim "Friar's Heel" is a corruption of "Freyja's He-ol" or "Freyja Sul", from the Nordic goddess Freyja and (allegedly) the Welsh words for "way" and "Sunday" respectively.  It is doubtful whether any prehistoric standing stone has experienced as many name changes and interpretations. Only in the past three decades have scientists used the name Heel Stone consistently.

References
 Atkinson, R J C, Stonehenge (Penguin Books, 1956)
 Cleal, Walker, & Montague, Stonehenge in its Landscape (London, English Heritage 1995)
 Cunliffe, B, & Renfrew, C, Science and Stonehenge (The British Academy 92, Oxford University Press 1997)
 Hawley, Lt-Col W, Report on the Excavations at Stonehenge during the season of 1923 (The Antiquaries Journal 5, Oxford University Press, 1925)

Further reading
 Newall, R S, Stonehenge, Wiltshire (Ancient monuments and historic buildings) (Her Majesty's Stationery Office, London, 1959)
 Pitts, M, Hengeworld (Arrow, London, 2001)
 Pitts, M W, On the Road to Stonehenge: Report on Investigations beside the A344 in 1968, 1979 and 1980 (Proceedings of the Prehistoric Society 48, 1982)
 Stone, J F S, Wessex Before the Celts (Frederick A Praeger Publishers, 1958)

Stonehenge